Woman in a Courtyard is an oil painting by the impressionist painter Suze Robertson acquired by the Groninger Museum in 1959.

See also
List of paintings by Suze Robertson

References

1900s paintings
Paintings in Groningen
Suze Robertson
Courtyards